The California Cup Distaff is an American thoroughbred horse race run annually at Santa Anita Park in Arcadia, California during its Oak Tree Racing Association meet in the fall of the year. as a downhill turf event over a distance of  six and one-half furlongs on the grass and is open to fillies and mares three-years-old and up bred in the state of California. The event currently offers a purse of $150,000 and a trophy.

The California Cup Distaff is part of the "California Cup Day" series of races intended to call attention to, and to honor, the California Thoroughbred racing and breeding industry.

Past winners

 2011 - Unzip Me 
 2010 -
 2009 -
 2008 - Lightmyfirebaby
 2007 - Gentle Charmer (Kyle Kaenel) 
 2006 - River's Prayer
 2005 - Tempting Date
 2004 - Our Mango
 2003 - Blind Ambition
 2002 - Lil Sister Stich
 2001 - Jeweled Pirate
 2000 - Chichim
 1999 - Chichim
 1998 - Bountiful Dreamer
 1997 - Seattle Carla
 1996 - Cat's Cradle
 1995 - Klassy Kim
 1994 - Nannetta
 1993 - Miss L Attack
 1992 - Bel's Starlet
 1991 - Bel's Starlet
 1990 - Linda Card

References
 Oak Tree racing meet at Santa Anita
 California Cup Distaff at Pedigree Query.com

Horse races in California
Graded stakes races in the United States
Turf races in the United States
Racing series for horses
1990 establishments in California
Recurring sporting events established in 1990